is a former Japanese football player.

Career
Shogo Yoshizawa joined J1 League club Albirex Niigata in 2005. In 2006, he moved to S.League club Albirex Niigata Singapore. In 2007, he backed to Albirex Niigata.

References

1986 births
Living people
Association football people from Gunma Prefecture
Japanese footballers
J1 League players
Japan Football League players
Albirex Niigata players
Arte Takasaki players
Association football midfielders